Jacob Rozani (born 24 January 1988) is a South African middle distance runner.

Rozani took first in the 800 meters at the 2014 South African Athletics Championships.

Rozani took second in the 800 meters at the 2016 African Championships in Athletics.  In this finish, he earned the qualifying standard for the 2016 Olympics.

At the 2016 Summer Olympics, he finished 5th in his heat for the 800 m with a time of 1:49.79. He did not qualify for the semifinals.

References

External links

1988 births
Living people
South African male middle-distance runners
Athletes (track and field) at the 2016 Summer Olympics
Olympic athletes of South Africa